Saint-Juste-du-Lac is a municipality in the province of Quebec, Canada, located within the Témiscouata Regional County Municipality in the Bas-Saint-Laurent region. As of the Canada 2011 Census, the municipality had a population of 585.

See also
Touladi River
List of municipalities in Quebec

References

External links
  Saint-Juste-du-Lac

Municipalities in Quebec
Incorporated places in Bas-Saint-Laurent